Bridgen is a surname, and a place name, it may refer to:

Surname
 Andrew Bridgen (born 1964), English politician and businessman
 Nevena Bridgen, Serbian opera singer and blogger, wife of Andrew

Places
 Bridgen, London, a place near Blendon in the London Borough of Bexley, United Kingdom.